Maury Daniel Bramson (born 1951 in New York City) is an American mathematician, specializing in probability theory and mathematical statistics.

Education and career
Bramson grew up in the Los Angeles area and graduated with a bachelor's degree in mathematics from the University of California, Berkeley after having also attended the University of California, San Diego and having participated in the University of California's Education Abroad Program at the University of Göttingen. He graduated with a master's degree in statistics from Stanford University. In 1977 he received his PhD from Cornell University with thesis Maximal Displacement of Branching Brownian Motion under the supervision of Harry Kesten. Bramson was an instructor at the Courant Institute of Mathematical Sciences. He was a member of the mathematical faculties of the University of Wisconsin–Madison and the University of California, Davis before becoming a professor at the University of Minnesota. He was at the Institute for Advanced Study for the academic year 1995–1996.

Bramson's research deals with models of interacting particle systems, stochastic networks, and branching processes. The models are motivated by physical and biological science, engineering, and computer science.

Bramson was an Invited Speaker at the International Congress of Mathematicians in Berlin in 1998. He was elected a Fellow of the American Mathematical Society in the class of 2015 for "contributions to stochastic processes and their applications." He was elected a member of the National Academy of Sciences in 2017. He is also a Fellow of the Institute of Mathematical Statistics.

Selected publications

Articles

Books
 
  2012 pbk reprint

References

1951 births
Living people
20th-century American mathematicians
21st-century American mathematicians
Probability theorists
UC Berkeley College of Letters and Science alumni
Cornell University alumni
University of Minnesota faculty
Members of the United States National Academy of Sciences
Fellows of the American Mathematical Society
Fellows of the Institute of Mathematical Statistics